The 1981 Brownlow Medal was the 54th year the award was presented to the player adjudged the fairest and best player during the Victorian Football League (VFL) home and away season. Bernie Quinlan of the Fitzroy Football Club and Barry Round of the South Melbourne Football Club both won the medal by polling twenty-two votes during the 1981 VFL season.

Prior the 1981 season, the VFL amended the rules to allow for the awarding Brownlow Medals jointly to all players tied for the most votes; this eliminated tie-breakers which had previously been in place to ensure there would be only a single winner. The tie between Round and Quinlan meant that this new provision was used in its very first season.

Leading votegetters

References 

1981 in Australian rules football
1981